Oenopota sanctamonicae is an extinct species of sea snail, a marine gastropod mollusk in the family Mangeliidae.

Description

Distribution
This extinct marine species was found off San Pedro, California, USA.

References

 Arnold, Ralph. The paleontology and stratigraphy of the marine Pliocene and Pleistocene of San Pedro, California. Vol. 3. The Academy, 1903.

sanctamonicae
Gastropods described in 1903